Ronald R. Breaker, Ph.D. (born 1964) is a Sterling Professor of Molecular, Cellular, and Developmental Biology at Yale University. He is best known for the discovery of riboswitches. His current research is focused on understanding advanced functions of nucleic acids, including the discovery and analysis of riboswitches and ribozymes.

Research
Ronald earned his B.S. in Biology and Chemistry  from the University of Wisconsin–Stevens Point and his Ph.D. in Biochemistry from Purdue University with Peter T Gilham. He was a postdoctoral fellow at The Scripps Research Institute with Gerald Joyce. While at Scripps, he isolated the first DNA enzyme (deoxyribozyme). He joined the molecular, cellular, and developmental biology department at Yale University. His research group worked on in vitro engineered riboswitches, RNA biosensors, and began to look for riboswitches in nature and identified the Cobalamin riboswitch. Over the next decade, the group would perform pivotal work establishing the role of ligand-binding RNAs and resulted in the discovery of multiple classes of riboswitches.

He has been a Howard Hughes Medical Institute (HHMI) Investigator since 2005. Breaker is a member of the JASON defense advisory group, and was elected to the U.S. National Academy of Sciences in 2013.

Awards
AAAS Fellow, 2004
American Society for Microbiology Eli Lilly Award, 2005
NAS Award in Molecular Biology, 2006
Rolf Sammet Professorship, Goethe University Frankfurt, 2012
Distinguished Alumni Award, University of Wisconsin–Stevens Point, 2010
U.S. National Academy of Sciences, 2013 
Distinguished Alumni Award, Purdue University, 2014
ASBMB–Merck Award, 2016

References

External links 
Academic Bio
Howard Hughes Medical Institute bio
Breaker Lab website

Living people
American biochemists
Howard Hughes Medical Investigators
Purdue University alumni
University of Wisconsin–Stevens Point alumni
Yale Department of Molecular, Cellular, and Developmental Biology faculty
Place of birth missing (living people)
Scripps Research alumni
Members of the United States National Academy of Sciences
Members of JASON (advisory group)
1964 births
Yale Sterling Professors